PEN15 is an American cringe comedy television series, created by Maya Erskine, Anna Konkle, and Sam Zvibleman, that premiered on February 8, 2019, on Hulu. The series stars Erskine and Konkle, who also serve as executive producers alongside Zvibleman, Andy Samberg, Akiva Schaffer, Jorma Taccone, Becky Sloviter, Marc Provissiero, Brooke Pobjoy, Debbie Liebling, and Gabe Liedman.

In May 2019, Hulu renewed the series for a second season of fourteen episodes, the first half of which premiered on September 18, 2020. In November 2021, it was reported that the series' second season will be its final season.

Premise
PEN15 is described as "middle school as it really happened". Erskine and Konkle – who were both 31 years old at the start of season 1 – "play versions of themselves as 13-year-old social outcasts in the year 2000, surrounded by actual 13-year-olds, where the best day of your life can turn into your worst with the stroke of a gel pen."  The show takes its name from a school prank involving tricking someone in to writing the word "PEN15" on their hands, by asking if they want to join the "Pen 15 Club."

Cast and characters

Main
Maya Erskine as Maya Ishii-Peters, a shy and sensitive Japanese-American seventh-grader who is best friends with Anna and is primarily raised by her mother. Maya can be immature and spontaneous at times, but she makes friends with her class clown behavior.
Anna Konkle as Anna Kone, a seventh-grader who is best friends with Maya and struggling with her parents' divorce. Anna is the school's best singer and often copes with her home life with music. Anna is more mature than Maya, but also more likely to give in to peer pressure.
Mutsuko Erskine as Yuki Ishii-Peters, Maya's stern but caring mother. She is Erskine's mother in real life.
Richard Karn as Fred Peters, Maya's musician father who is often on tour with his Steely Dan cover band.
Taylor Nichols as Curtis Kone, Anna's father, whom she occasionally finds sleeping on the couch after a fight with his wife.
Melora Walters as Kathy Kone, Anna's mother, whose New Age spirituality and high-strung personality clash with her husband.
Taj Cross as Sam Zablowski, a carpool friend of both leads who develops a crush on Maya.
Dallas Liu as Shuji Ishii-Peters, Maya's older brother and sometimes defender, who tries to be cool and is often seen smoking cannabis outside school.

Recurring

Dylan Gage as Gabe Leib
Sami Rappoport as Becca
Anna Pniowsky as Heather Taylor
Ivan Mallon as Ian Walsh
Hannah Mae as Connie M
Tony Espinosa as Jafeer
Brady Allen as Brendan Tooler
Jill Basey as Ms. Bell
Lincoln Jolly as Alex
Brandon Keener as Mr. O
Allius Barnes as Evan
Marion Van Cuyck as Terra Newback
Jessica Pressley as Jessica Abrams
David Bowe as Albert
Diane Delano as Jan
Jonah Beres as Brandt
Nathaniel Matulessya as Skyler
Katie Silverman as Stevie
Brekkan Spens as Ben Field
Bernadette Guckin as Mrs. Tooler
Tim Russ as Mr. Wyzell
Isaac Edwards as Dustin
Jennifer Steadman as Suze
Carmina Garay as Jenna
Ashlee Grubbs as Maura
Sara Boustany as Miranda
Rebecca Faye Vincent as Marissa H
Chau Long as Steve
Albert Howell as Principal Ravage
Brandon Soo Hoo as Andy Kim
Michael Angarano as Greg Rosso
Bill Kottkamp as Derrick

Guest
Jessy Hodges as Ms. Bennett ("Solo")
Laura Kightlinger as Deb Taylor ("Community Service")
Annie Korzen as Rose ("Community Service")
Noah Mills as Flymiamibro22 ("AIM")

Episodes

Season 1 (2019)

Season 2 (2020–21)

Production

Development
On April 19, 2018, Hulu announced that it had given the production a series order for a first season consisting of ten episodes. Erskine and Konkle were also expected to write for the series and Zvibleman was set to direct multiple episodes. Production companies involved with the series were slated to consist of The Lonely Island, Party Over Here, Odenkirk Provissiero, and AwesomenessTV. On November 19, 2018, it was announced that the series would premiere on February 8, 2019. On May 1, 2019, it was reported that Hulu renewed the series for a second season, of which the first seven episodes were released on September 18, 2020.  The first episode from the second set of seven episodes premiered on August 27, 2021. Originally intended to run for three seasons, the filming of the second season was severely delayed by the COVID-19 pandemic, and by the conclusion both Erskine and Konkle had new acting roles, as well as parental responsibilities. On November 29, 2021, it was reported that the series' second season would be its final season.

Casting
Alongside the announcement of the series order, it was confirmed that Erskine and Konkle would star in the series as well.

Release
On November 19, 2018, a video was released announcing the premiere date of the series. On December 20, 2018, a teaser trailer for the series was released. On January 18, 2019, an official trailer and poster were released. The first season was released on Hulu on February 8, 2019, and the first seven episodes of the second season were released on September 18, 2020. The eighth episode of the season was released on August 27, 2021, and the rest premiered on December 3, 2021.

Reception

Season 1 
On the review aggregation website Rotten Tomatoes, the series holds a "Certified Fresh" 94% approval rating with an average rating of 8.04 out of 10 based on 47 reviews. The website's critical consensus reads, "Viewers willing to suspend their disbelief will find much to enjoy in Pen15, wherein Maya Erskine and Anna Konkle reprise their adolescent selves – stirring up plenty of yucks and pathos amidst the farce." Metacritic, which uses a weighted average, assigned the series a score of 82 out of 100 based on 17 critics, indicating "universal acclaim".

Season 2 
On Rotten Tomatoes, season two holds a 100% approval rating based on 52 reviews with an average rating of 8.82/10. The critical consensus reads, "An excellent showcase for Maya Erskine, Anna Konkle, and their well-cast classmates, PEN15's sophomore season goes deeper into the nuances of middle school life without losing any of its cringey charm." On Metacritic, season 2 received a score of 93 out of 100 based on 11 critical reviews, indicating "universal acclaim".

Accolades

References

External links

2010s American school television series
2010s American teen sitcoms
2020s American school television series
2020s American teen sitcoms
2019 American television series debuts
2021 American television series endings
Awesomeness (company)
English-language television shows
Hulu original programming
Middle school television series
Television series about teenagers
Television series set in 2000
Asian-American television
Television series by Paramount Television
Works about puberty